The Kastellet ferry, also known as the Vaxholmen ferry, is a passenger cable ferry in Sweden's Stockholm archipelago. At its town terminus, the ferry berths next to the quay used by the Waxholmsbolaget passenger ferries that link Vaxholm to central Stockholm and many other islands of the archipelago.

There are between two and four return crossings an hour, each of which conveys a maximum of 130 passengers. The service only operates from the start of May to the end of September.

The vessel used on the crossing is named Vaxholmen and is electrically powered, using a supply cable attached to the shore at the Vaxholm end and paid out on a drum on the vessel. The power cable is lowered to the bottom of the channel when the vessel is docked at Vaxholm Castle, as are the guidance cables when the ferry is docked at either terminal, thus allowing shipping to transit the channel. The Vaxholmen was built in 1967, but reconstructed and converted to electrical power in 2015, in time for the opening of the new service in 2016.

The ferry is run by Trafikverket under contract to the Vaxholm Municipality. The municipality is responsible for defining timetables, ticket prices and ferry conditions, while Trafikverket is responsible for operating the ferry.

References

External links 

Pages on the Kastelletleden from Trafikverket web site (includes link to timetable)

Ferries of Sweden
Transport in Stockholm County
Cable ferries